The fifth and final season of the television series The Wire commenced airing in the United States on January 6, 2008, and concluded on March 9, 2008; it was the show's shortest season with 10 episodes. The series introduced a fictionalized version of the Baltimore Sun newsroom, while continuing to follow the Baltimore police department and city hall, and the Stanfield crime syndicate.

The fifth season aired on Sundays at 9:00 pm ET in the United States. The season was released on DVD as a four disc boxed set under the title of The Wire: The Complete Fifth Season on August 12, 2008 by HBO Video.

Production
HBO announced on September 12, 2006, that a fifth and final season consisting of 13 episodesbut later reduced to tenhad been commissioned. Production for Season 5 officially began on April 30, 2007. Filming wrapped early in the morning of September 1, 2007 and the first episode aired on January 6, 2008.

In an interview with Slate on December 1, 2006, David Simon said that Season 5 would be about the media and media consumption. A major focus would be journalism, which would be dramatized through a newspaper modeled after The Baltimore Sun. The theme, according to Simon, would deal with "what stories get told and what don't and why it is that things stay the same." 

Issues such as the quest for profit, the decrease in the number of reporters, and the end of aspiration for news quality would all be addressed, alongside the theme of homelessness. In the same interview, Simon indicated that no other theme seemed substantial enough to warrant a sixth season, except possibly the large influx of Latinos into Baltimore. He noted, however, that since no writer on the show spoke Spanish or had any intimate knowledge of the city's Latino population, the field work would be too cumbersome.

At the Night at the Wire event on June 9, 2007, Simon stated that Detective Sydnor is the only character who remains morally clean by the end of the show, but not perfectly since "after all, this is The Wire." He also hinted that Mayor Carcetti might make a run for governor.

The series continued the show's examination of the devaluing of human life and institutional dysfunction. The increased scope of the season to include the media allowed this theme to be explored through an examination of "the people who are supposed to be monitoring all this and sounding the alarm — the journalists." In particular Simon has spoken about the devaluing of the reporter in terms of downsizing a newspaper staff and the management expecting to do "more with less" when he asserts that in reality, you can only do "less with less."

The series realism has been reported as being maintained particularly through the accurate dialogue and use of contemporary slang. Series creator David Simon further expanded on the thematic content of season five in an interview with Fancast/Inside TV. Critic David Zurawik saw the unifying theme of the season as "public and private lies," particularly those perpetuated by the media and told by Jimmy McNulty in protest against cutbacks in the police department. TV Guide writer Matt Roush also saw the central theme as lies and characterized it as "deeply and darkly ironic."

Promotion

A preview for Season 5 of The Wire aired on HBO on October 28, 2007 and was later made available on YouTube. HBO sent critics the first seven episodes on DVD in December 2007.

HBO's On Demand and multiplatform marketing division approached creator David Simon about producing exclusive on-demand content and three short prequel clips were produced that take place prior to the linear storyline of the show. The clips were made available via Amazon.com from December 5 and through HBO's on-demand service from December 15. 

The first video takes place in 1962 and focuses on the school days of drug kingpin Proposition Joe; the second is set in 1985 and focuses on Omar Little making an early robbery; the third video is set in 2000 and shows the first meeting of Jimmy McNulty (played by Dominic West) and Bunk Moreland (Wendell Pierce). The clips aired after Season 5 episodes as they premiered starting January 6, 2008.

Locations
At that Night at the Wire event, fans were allowed to tour the Baltimore Sun newsroom constructed for the show. The real newspaper allowed the show to use their name but stipulated that no current employees could appear in the series. The newsroom was an entirely built set constructed at the show's out-of-town soundstage.

The actual Washington Post newsroom was also featured, as one reporter visits for an interview. The Wire is the first production to be allowed to film at the location; even the film All the President's Men about the paper's role in breaking the Watergate scandal had to build a set to represent the paper.

Cast

It was rumored in August 2007 that Homicide: Life on the Street stars Richard Belzer and Clark Johnson would guest star in the fifth season. Johnson was later confirmed as joining the starring cast to play Gus Haynes, "a city editor who tries to hold the line against dwindling coverage, buyouts, and pseudo-news."The New Yorker described an early scene from the season where Haynes rants about a reporter inserting a charred doll into scenes of fires to eke more sympathy from his readers. Johnson also directed the final episode of the show.  In the episode "Took," Belzer made a cameo appearance as John Munch, the police detective he has portrayed since 1993 on Homicide (1993–1999) and Law & Order: Special Victims Unit (1999–2013). 

The majority of the starring cast from the fourth season returned. On the police front, Dominic West returned as Jimmy McNulty with a larger storyline than the fourth season; John Doman as Deputy Commissioner William Rawls; Seth Gilliam as Western district Sergeant Ellis Carver; Corey Parker Robinson as Major Case Unit detective Leander Sydnor; Deirdre Lovejoy as prosecutor Rhonda Pearlman; Clarke Peters as veteran Detective Lester Freamon; Wendell Pierce as veteran homicide Detective Bunk Moreland; Lance Reddick as Colonel Cedric Daniels; and Sonja Sohn as Detective Kima Greggs.

In the political storyline, Aidan Gillen returned as ambitious Mayor Tommy Carcetti; as well as Reg E. Cathey as political aide Norman Wilson; and Domenick Lombardozzi as troubled defense investigator Thomas "Herc" Hauk.

In the street, Jamie Hector returned as West-side drug kingpin Marlo Stanfield. Also returning for the street storyline were Andre Royo as heroin addict Bubbles; and Michael K. Williams as underworld legend Omar Little. 

Former recurring characters who joined the main cast were Tristan Wilds as Michael Lee, Gbenga Akinnagbe as Chris Partlow, Jermaine Crawford as Duquan "Dukie" Weems, Isiah Whitlock, Jr. as corrupt State Senator Clay Davis, Michael Kostroff as defense attorney Maurice Levy, and Neal Huff as Mayoral chief of staff Michael Steintorf.

In addition to Johnson, joining the main cast in the journalism story line were Tom McCarthy as morally challenged reporter Scott Templeton and Michelle Paress as reporter Alma Gutierrez. 

Season 4 main cast members Frankie Faison, Jim True-Frost, Robert Wisdom, and Chad L. Coleman, who played Ervin Burrell, Roland "Prez" Pryzbylewski, Howard "Bunny" Colvin and Dennis "Cutty" Wise, respectively, had recurring but not starring roles in the season. 

Other returning guest stars included Steve Earle as drug counsellor Walon; Anwan Glover as Slim Charles; Robert F. Chew as drug kingpin Proposition Joe; Method Man as drug lieutenant Melvin "Cheese" Wagstaff; Felicia Pearson as the eponymous criminal enforcer Felicia "Snoop" Pearson; Chris Ashworth as former enforcer for the Greeks Sergei "Serge" Malatov; Wood Harris as fallen kingpin Avon Barksdale; Marlyne Afflack as city council president Nerese Campbell; and Amy Ryan as McNulty's domestic partner Beadie Russell. The return of guest stars from past seasons was described in reviews as a reward to loyal viewers. 

New recurring guest stars included David Costabile, Sam Freed, Bruce Kirkpatrick, Todd Scofield, Kara Quick, and Donald Neal.

Continuing the show's trend of using non-professional actors and real-life Baltimore figures, several ex-Baltimore Sun reporters appeared in recurring roles. The editor character Rebecca Corbett, played by actress Kara Quick, was named after and based on Simon's former editor at the Baltimore Sun who now works at The New York Times; the real Rebecca Corbett has a cameo near the end of the series. Writer and former political reporter William F. Zorzi gained further screen time after his season 1 cameo. 

Steve Luxenberg, the editor responsible for hiring Simon at The Sun, also had a role. Simon's wife Laura Lippman also appeared as a reporter in an early scene alongside Michael Olesker, another former Sun reporter. Baltimore attorney Billy Murphy appeared as a lawyer for corrupt Senator Clay Davis, and former senator and current radio host Larry Young conducted a fictional interview with the character. Former police commissioner Ed Norris returned in his recurring role as a homicide detective with the same name.

Main cast
 Dominic West as Jimmy McNulty (10 episodes)
 Reg E. Cathey as Norman Wilson (10 episodes)
 John Doman as William Rawls (9 episodes)
 Aidan Gillen as Tommy Carcetti (10 episodes)
 Clark Johnson as Augustus Haynes (10 episodes)
 Deirdre Lovejoy as Rhonda Pearlman (9 episodes)
 Tom McCarthy as Scott Templeton (10 episodes)
 Clarke Peters as Lester Freamon (10 episodes)
 Wendell Pierce as Bunk Moreland (10 episodes)
 Lance Reddick as Cedric Daniels (9 episodes)
 Andre Royo as Reginald "Bubbles" Cousins (6 episodes)
 Sonja Sohn as Kima Greggs (10 episodes)
 Seth Gilliam as Ellis Carver (7 episodes)
 Domenick Lombardozzi as Herc (5 episodes)
 Michael K. Williams as Omar Little (6 episodes)
 Gbenga Akinnagbe as Chris Partlow (9 episodes)
 Jamie Hector as Marlo Stanfield (9 episodes)
 Neal Huff as Michael Steintorf (9 episodes)
 Jermaine Crawford as Dukie Weems (8 episodes)
 Corey Parker Robinson as Leander Sydnor (9 episodes)
 Tristan Wilds as Michael Lee (9 episodes)
 Michael Kostroff as Maurice Levy (5 episodes)
 Michelle Paress as Alma Gutierrez (10 episodes)
 Isiah Whitlock Jr. as Clay Davis (7 episodes)

Crew
Creator David Simon continued to act as the show's executive producer and show runner. Nina Kostroff Noble once again served as the show's other executive producer. Joe Chappelle reprised his co-executive producer role and continued to direct episodes. Ed Burns once again served as a writer and joined Chappelle as a co-executive producer. Karen L. Thorson returned as a producer. George Pelecanos produced the sixth episode of the series only - his first production work since the third season.

Political journalist William F. Zorzi continued to write for the show and guide the political storylines. Acclaimed crime fiction novelist Pelecanos returned as a writer and contributed his seventh episode to the series. Pelecanos's fellow crime novelists Richard Price and Dennis Lehane also returned as writers. Chris Collins returned as a staff writer and contributed his first script. David Mills contributed an episode, completing the writing team.

New star Clark Johnson also helmed the final episode after previously directing the pilot. Other returning directors for the fifth season included Ernest Dickerson, Anthony Hemingway, Agnieszka Holland, Dan Attias, and Seith Mann. Series star Dominic West made his directorial debut. Husband and wife directing team Scott and Joy Kecken were also first time directors on the fifth season.

Reception
The fifth season received widespread acclaim from critics, scoring 89 out of 100 based on 24 reviews on Metacritic. On Rotten Tomatoes, the season has an approval rating of 93% with an average score of 9.8 out of 10 based on 44 reviews. The website's critical consensus reads, "The Wire goes out with a suitably resonant bang in its final season, craftily maneuvering venturesome motifs and a colorful cast of characters to skillfully understated conclusion."

Matt Roush of TV Guide favorably reviewed the series calling it "brilliantly bleak" and a "landmark series." Brian Lowry of Variety characterized the series' look at the media as the most realistic portrayal of a newsroom in film and television history.

However, Leigh Claire La Berge found that "in the popular press [...] the level of critical anticipation that greeted that season was matched only by the immediate disappointment that followed it", noting that the season is The Wires most explicitly didactic, the one that most obviously comments on the series's own fictionality, and the one with the least realistic plot. Thus in reviewing the first seven episodes of the fifth season David Zurawik of the Baltimore Sun said that while "there is greatness in the seven episodes," the major newspaper storyline "contain[s] nothing that matches the emotional power and sociological insight of the show at its best." La Berge argued that it is precisely the fifth season's capacity to explore the social construction of realism itself that is the season's most important characteristic.

Awards and nominations60th Primetime Emmy AwardsNomination for Outstanding Writing for a Drama Series (Ed Burns & David Simon) (Episode: "–30–")Writers Guild of America AwardsNomination for Best Drama Series24th TCA AwardsAward for Heritage Award'
Nomination for Program of the Year
Nomination for Outstanding Achievement in Drama
Nomination for Outstanding Individual Achievement in Drama (David Simon)

Episodes

All episodes except "-30-" were made available by HBO six days earlier than their broadcast date, via On Demand.

References

External links
 
 

2008 American television seasons
 5
Television series about journalism